Pteromeris is a genus of molluscs in the family Carditidae.

The related genus Coripia is sometimes included here.

Species
 Pteromeris perplana (Conrad, 1841) – flat cardita

References

Carditidae
Bivalve genera